Brewill is a surname. Notable people with the surname include:

Arthur Brewill (1861–1923), British architect
Lionel Colin Brewill (1889–1943), British architect, son of Arthur

English-language surnames